Roke is a hamlet in South Oxfordshire, about  north of Wallingford. It has a sixteenth-century public house, the Home Sweet Home. It is now included in the neighbouring civil parish of Berrick Salome.

Culture 
Roke hosts the annual Rokefest Beer and Music Festival.

References

Hamlets in Oxfordshire
South Oxfordshire District